The Rensselaer RP-3 (for Rensselaer Polytechnic design 3) is an American mid-wing, T-tailed single-seat, glider that was designed by Brian E. Thompson and produced by the Rensselaer Polytechnic Institute of Troy, New York.  It first flew in 1998.

Design and development
The RP-3 was the third aircraft design in Rensselaer's Composite Aircraft Program and was completed in 1998.

The aircraft is of composite construction. Its  span wing employs a Wortmann FX-67-K170/17 airfoil and features split flaps. The landing gear is a retractable monowheel, with an auxiliary tailwheel. Despite its large wingspan the RP-3 achieved only a 32:1 glide ratio.

Only one RP-3 was built and it was registered with the Federal Aviation Administration in the Experimental - Amateur-built category.

Aircraft on display
New York State Museum

Specifications (RP-3)

See also

References

External links
Photo of the RP-3 in the NY State Museum

1990s United States sailplanes
Aircraft first flown in 1998
T-tail aircraft
Mid-wing aircraft